Kurt Waldemar Tank (24 February 1898 – 5 June 1983) was a German aeronautical engineer and test pilot who led the design department at Focke-Wulf from 1931 to 1945. He was responsible for the creation of several important Luftwaffe aircraft of World War II, including the Fw 190 fighter aircraft, the Ta 152 fighter-interceptor and the Fw 200 Condor airliner. After the war, Tank spent two decades designing aircraft abroad, working first in Argentina and then in India, before returning to Germany in the late 1960s to work as a consultant for Messerschmitt-Bölkow-Blohm (MBB).

Early life

Tank was born in Bromberg (Bydgoszcz), Province of Posen. His grandfather was a cavalry sergeant in the Uhlans and his father, Willi Tank, was a grenadier sergeant in the 3rd Division. When World War I broke out Tank wished to join the Deutsches Heer'''s then-named  Fliegertruppe air service, but his father insisted he instead follow the family tradition and enlist in the cavalry. He ended the war as a captain, with many decorations for bravery.

Career

After the war, Tank graduated from the Technical University of Berlin in 1923. A mentor from the university secured him his first job, in the design department of Rohrbach Metallflugzeug GmbH, where he worked on flying boats, and helped design a passenger aircraft, the Ro VIII Roland.

Tank moved to the firm Albatros Flugzeugwerke, where he worked as a test pilot. The Albatros company went bankrupt in 1929 and in 1931, under government pressure, was merged with Focke-Wulf.

Tank then started work on the design of the Fw 44 Stieglitz (Goldfinch), a two-seat civilian biplane. It was Focke-Wulf's first commercially successful design, launched in 1932. In 1934 Tank's Fw 56 advanced trainer began production. This led to burgeoning growth for the company as Hitler began to prepare the country for war.

Ludwig Roselius, chairman and 46% majority shareholder of Focke-Wulf via Kaffee HAG, and Barbara Goette - his closest confidante, met with Kurt Tank in the Marcus-Allee, Bremen on many occasions. Barbara declared Focke-Wulf to be a "war-determining" enterprise.

In 1936 Tank designed the Focke-Wulf Fw 200 Condor to a Deutsche Luft Hansa specification for air transport. The first flight, with Tank as pilot, occurred in July 1937, less than a year after work had begun. The Condor made a famous non-stop flight from Berlin to New York City in 1938, proving the concept of transatlantic air travel. The Condor would later be used as a maritime patrol bomber aircraft of some repute during the war.

World War II

The Fw 190 Würger (Shrike), first flying in 1939 and produced from 1941 to 1945, was a mainstay Luftwaffe single-seat fighter during World War II, and Tank's most-produced (over 20,000) and famous design. In January 1943, he was named honorary professor with a chair at the Technical University of Braunschweig, in recognition of his work developing aircraft.

In 1944, the Reichsluftfahrtministerium'' (German Air Ministry) decided that new fighter aircraft designations must include the chief designer's name. Kurt Tank's new designs were therefore given the prefix Ta. His most notable late-war design was the high-speed/high-altitude Ta 152 single-engine fighter, a continuation of the Fw 190 design.

Postwar
After the war, Tank negotiated for an employment position with the United Kingdom, with the Nationalist government of China, and with representatives of the Soviet Union. The British government decided not to offer him a contract on the grounds that they could not see how he could be integrated into a research project or design group.

When those negotiations proved unsuccessful, he accepted an offer from Argentina to work at its aerotechnical institute, the Instituto Aerotécnico in Córdoba under the name of Pedro Matthies. 

Tank moved to Córdoba in central Argentina in late 1946, with many of his Focke-Wulf co-workers. One of these was Ronald Richter, who proposed to power airplanes with nuclear energy, to be developed in the Huemul Project, which was later proven to be a fraud according to some.

The Instituto Aerotécnico later became Argentina's military aeroplane factory, the Fábrica Militar de Aviones. While there, Tank designed the IAe Pulqui II based on the Focke-Wulf Ta 183 design that had reached mock-up stage by the end of World War II; it was a state-of-the-art design for its day, but the project was cancelled after the fall of Peron in 1955. When President Juan Perón fell from power, the ex-Focke-Wulf team dispersed, with many, including Tank, moving to India. First he worked as Director of the Madras Institute of Technology, where one of his students was future President of India Abdul Kalam, who went on to design the indigenous Satellite Launch Vehicle (SLV) and lead the Integrated Guided Missile Development Programme. Tank later joined Hindustan Aeronautics, where he designed the Hindustan Marut fighter-bomber, the first military aircraft constructed in India. The first prototype flew in 1961, and the Marut was retired from active service in 1985. Tank left Hindustan Aeronautics in 1967 and by the 1970s, he had returned to live in Berlin, basing himself in Germany for the rest of his life. He worked as a consultant for MBB.

Death 
He died in Munich in 1983.

References

External links

 

1898 births
1983 deaths
Aircraft designers
People from Bydgoszcz
German aerospace engineers
German Army personnel of World War I
German people of World War II
German expatriates in Argentina
People from the Province of Posen
Technical University of Berlin alumni
Academic staff of the Technical University of Braunschweig
Engineers from Berlin
German expatriates in India